Livingston is a surname with several different origins. The name itself originates in Scotland as a habitational name derived from Livingston in Lothian which was originally named in Middle English Levingston. This place name was originally named after a man named Levin who appears in several 12th-century charters. In Ireland (and in some cases Scotland), the name was adopted by people bearing the Gaelic surnames Ó Duinnshléibhe and Mac Duinnshléibhe. Livingston can also be an Americanized form of Lowenstein, a Jewish surname.

Notable people
AzMarie Livingston (born 1986), Fashion Model
 Alan W. Livingston (1917–2009), American businessman, with Capitol Records
 Alexander Livingston, 5th Lord Livingston (c. 1500 – 1553), guardian of Mary Queen of Scots
 Barry Livingston (born 1953), American actor, known for My Three Sons
 Bob Livingston (born 1943), U.S. Congressman from Louisiana
 Bob Livingston (musician) (born 1948), American musician
 Burton Edward Livingston (1875–1948), an American plant physiologist
 Charles Livingston, American football coach during the 1888 season
 Charles L. Livingston (1800–1873), Speaker of the New York State Assembly in 1832 and 1833
 Christopher C. Livingston, the creator of webcomic Concerned: The Half-Life and Death of Gordon Frohman
 David Livingston, American TV producer and director, known for Star Trek
 Debra Ann Livingston (born 1959), Chief Judge of the United States Court of Appeals for the Second Circuit
Denzel Livingston (born 1993), basketball player for Hapoel Kfar Saba of the Israeli Liga Leumit
 Edward Livingston (disambiguation), several people
 Guy Livingston (British Army officer) (1881–1950), British Army and Royal Air Force officer
 Henry Livingston (disambiguation), several people
 Ian Livingston, Baron Livingston of Parkhead (born 1964), Scottish businessman
 J. Livingston (born 1957), born Philip Livingston Jones, Anglo-Indian film actor
 J. Sterling Livingston (1916–2010), American educator and management consultant
 Jacob H. Livingston (1896–1950), New York politician and judge
 James Livingston (disambiguation), several people
 Jamie Livingston (1956–1997), photographer, film-maker and circus performer
 Jason Livingston (born 1971), British sprint athlete
 Jay Livingston (1915–2001), American songwriter
 John Livingston (disambiguation), several people
 Josiah O. Livingston (1837–1917), American Civil War Medal of Honor recipient
 Kevin Livingston (born 1973), American Pro cyclist, US Nat'l Champion, Tour de France Rider
 Margaret Livingston (1895–1984), silent film actress
 Mary Livingston (c. 1541 – 1571), companion of Mary Queen of Scots
 Maturin Livingston (1769–1847), New York judge
 M. Stanley Livingston (1905–1986), American accelerator physicist
 Paul Livingston (born 1956), Australian comedian
 Peter R. Livingston (1766–1847), New York politician
 Peter Van Brugh Livingston (1710–1792), New York politician
 Philip Livingston (1716–1778), Signer of the U.S. Declaration of Independence
 Philip Livingston (1686–1749), New York politician
 Randy Livingston (born 1975), American professional basketball player
 Robert Livingston (disambiguation), several people
 Ron Livingston (born 1967), American actor
 Shaun Livingston (born 1985), American professional basketball player
 Stanley Livingston (born 1950), American actor, known for My Three Sons
 Thomas Livingston (c. 1390 – c. 1460), Scottish prelate and diplomat
 Thomas Livingston (Royal Navy officer) (1769-1853) British admiral who served during the Napoleonic Wars
 Walter Livingston (1740–1797), Speaker of the New York State Assembly
 William Livingston (1723–1790), signer of the U.S. Constitution
 William Livingston (disambiguation), several people

See also
Livingston family
Lord Livingston
Livingston (disambiguation)
Livingstone (disambiguation)
MacDunleavy (dynasty)
Liebenstein
Jonathan Livingston Seagull

References 

Americanized surnames
English-language surnames
Scottish Gaelic-language surnames
Scottish toponymic surnames
Surnames of Lowland Scottish origin